John Goldman may refer to:
 John D. Goldman (born 1949), American businessman and philanthropist
 John M. Goldman (1938–2013), British haematologist, oncologist and medical researcher